August Jan Bedřich Seydler (1 June 1849 – 22 June 1891), aka August Johann Friedrich Seydler, was a distinguished Czech astronomer, theoretical physicist, and professor at Charles University in Prague. He was the founder of the Astronomical Institute of the Czech University (1886). He was born in Žamberk to a commissioner of customs Jan Nepomuk Seydler and his wife, Antonia Suková. He was a revered pedagogue and contributed significantly to astronomical studies, specifically, he elaborated sophisticated methods for the determination of orbits of minor planets. Appropriately, a minor planet is named after him.

External links
Short Overview of Contributions to Astronomy 
August Jan Bedřich Seydler Contributions 

1849 births
1891 deaths
People from Žamberk
Czech physicists
Czech astronomers
Charles University alumni